Liantang station, is a station of Line 9 of the Guangzhou Metro. It started operations on 28 December 2017.

Station layout

Exits

References

Railway stations in China opened in 2017
Guangzhou Metro stations in Huadu District